Loveridge Plantation is a quail hunting plantation located in northern Leon County, Florida, United States and established by George H. Love.
In 1956, Love acquired an additional  of Sunny Hill Plantation (northern section in map) from the estate of New Jersey Governor Walter E. Edge.

George H. Love was a native of Pittsburgh, Pennsylvania. He was Chairman of the Board of the M.A. Hanna Company and succeeded George M. Humphrey when he became United States Secretary of the Treasury in 1953. 

Love had been Chairman of the Board of Consolidation Coal Company, America's largest coal company. After reviving the coal industry, Love became Chairman of the Board of the Chrysler Corporation. 

Adjacent plantations:
Norias Plantation to the north
Foshalee Plantation to the west
Welaunee Plantation to the southwest
Ring Oak Plantation to the south

External links
 Loveridge Plantation official site

References

Plantations in Leon County, Florida